Yang Xuwen (born 2 April 1994) is a Chinese actor. He is best known in for his role as Guo Jing in The Legend of the Condor Heroes (2017).

Biography

Early life
Yang was born and raised in Nanjing, Jiangsu, on April 2, 1994. He attended Nanjing Foreign Language School and Nanjing No.9 Middle School. He entered Central Academy of Drama in September 2012, majoring in acting.

Acting career
In early 2014, Yang signed with Huayi Brothers Media Group. In July 2014, Yang made his acting debut in  historical drama Cosmetology High, playing a scholar. In August, he co-starred with Dilraba Dilmurat and Merxat in the web drama The Backlight of Love. In October, he played the lead role in the modern drama Horrible Bosses.

Yang's first major film role was in the action comedy film Bad Guys Always Die (2015). In October, he was cast in the youth military drama Deep Blue.

In April 2016, Yang had a minor role in the romantic drama film New York New York. In July, he featured in the fantasy action drama Noble Aspirations.

In January 2017, Yang portrayed Guo Jing in The Legend of the Condor Heroes, adapted from Louis Cha's wuxia novel of the same name.

In 2018, Yang starred in the business drama Excellent Investor and shenmo television series Ghost Catcher Zhong Kui’s Record.

In 2019, Yang starred in the military drama Anti-Terrorism Special Forces III. The same year, he was cast in the romance drama The Memory About You.

In 2022, Yang starred in the historical suspense drama Strange Tales of Tang Dynasty as the young general Lu Lingfeng.

Filmography

Film

Television series

References

External links

1994 births
Central Academy of Drama alumni
Living people
Chinese male film actors
Chinese male television actors
Male actors from Nanjing
21st-century Chinese male actors